RockIstanbul is the name of an old large scale open air rock festival series annually had been organized in Istanbul, Turkey. Highlights from recent performers include Kraftwerk, Garbage, Megadeth, Faithless, Queensrÿche, Starsailor, and Anathema.

Performances

2005
Kraftwerk
Garbage
Megadeth
JJ72
The Kills
Andy Smith
Andromeda
Duman
Mor ve Ötesi
Bülent Ortaçgil
Bulutsuzluk Özlemi
Kurban
Gürol Ağırbaş
Ceza
Rebel Moves
Nev
İhtiyaç Molası
Kesmeşeker
Çilekeş
110
Direc-t
Dorian
Hayko Cepkin
Elektrip
Bağdat Avenue
100 Derece
Yüksek Sadakat
Anima
Zardanadam
Tiktak
Kara Kedi
Deja Vu
Suitcase

2004
Faithless
Queensrÿche
Starsailor
Anathema
Evergrey
Mono
Hundred Reasons
Teoman
Bülent Ortaçgil
Pentagram, also known as Mezarkabul
Feridun Düzağaç
Mor ve Ötesi
Aslı
Ogün Sanlısoy
Düş Sokağı
Cem Köksal
Replikas
Ceza
Aylin Aslım
İhtiyaç Molası
Telvin
Müslüm Gürses
Fairuz Derin Bulut
Gripin
maNga
Çilekeş

See also
 Rock'n Coke

External links
RockIstanbul ORG, site of RockIstanbul ORG, organizer of the festival

Rock festivals in Turkey
Festivals in Istanbul